International Journal of Geographical Information Science is a monthly peer-reviewed scientific journal published by Taylor & Francis. The editor-in-chief is May Yuan  (University of Texas at Dallas), who succeeded Brian Lees (University of New South Wales)) in January 2017. The journal covers original research in fundamental and computational geographic information science, including applying geographical information science to monitoring, prediction, and decision making, as well as natural resources, social systems, computer science, cartography, surveying, geography, and engineering, in both developed and developing countries.

Abstracting and indexing 
The journal is abstracted and indexed in:

According to the Journal Citation Reports, the journal has a 2012 impact factor of 1.614.

References

External links 
 

Taylor & Francis academic journals
Geography journals
Publications established in 1997
Monthly journals
English-language journals
Information science journals
Geographic information science